is a Japanese classical violinist. She was the first Japanese and youngest winner at the Paganini Competition in Genoa in 1999.

Biography
Shoji was born in Tokyo into an artistic family (her mother is a painter; her grandmother, a poet) and spent her early childhood in Siena, Italy. When she was 5 years old her family moved back to Japan, where she started studying the violin. From 1995 until 2000, she studied at the Accademia Musicale Chigiana under Uto Ughi and Riccardo Brengola. At the age of 13, she went to Germany for a year to study with Saschko Gawriloff. In 1998, she moved to Germany to study at Hochschule für Musik Köln under Zakhar Bron and graduated in 2004. She then continued her study with Gawriloff and also took masterclasses of Shlomo Mintz.

In 1997, she made her debut at Lucerne Festival and Musikverein in Vienna with Rudolf Baumgartner. Two years later, she took the First Prize at the 1999 Paganini Competition. Zubin Mehta has been her strong supporter. When Shoji auditioned for him in 2000, he immediately changed his schedule in order to make her first recording with the Israel Philharmonic possible in the following month, then invited her to perform with Bavarian State Opera and Los Angeles Philharmonic.

Since then many prominent orchestras have invited Shoji, including Berlin Philharmonic, London Symphony Orchestra, Philharmonia Orchestra, New York Philharmonic, Baltimore Symphony, St. Petersburg Philharmonic Orchestra, Orchestra dell'Accademia Nazionale di Santa Cecilia and WDR Symphony Orchestra under the baton of Lorin Maazel, Sir Colin Davis, Wolfgang Sawallisch, Kurt Masur, Mariss Jansons, Yuri Temirkanov, Valery Gergiev, Myung-whun Chung  and Semyon Bychkov.

Shoji records with Deutsche Grammophon. Until 2009 she used the 1715 Joachim Stradivarius on loan from the Nippon Music Foundation; today she plays the 1729 Recamier Stradivarius on loan from Ryuzo Ueno, Honorary Chairman, Ueno Fine Chemicals Industry, Ltd.

Discography

External links
 

Japanese classical violinists
Living people
Hochschule für Musik und Tanz Köln alumni
Paganini Competition prize-winners
1983 births
21st-century classical violinists
Women classical violinists